Vladimir Grigor'evich Lukonin (21 January 1932 - 10 September 1984) was a Russian historian and archaeologist, specialising in the history and archaeology of ancient Iran.

Early life and education
Lukonin was born in Leningrad on 21 January 1932; his mother was a physician and his father an army general. From 1941 to 1944 he was evacuated to Samarkand with his  mother and younger brother. He studied at the Oriental faculty of the Leningrad State University, and did postgraduate work at the Hermitage Museum. His doctoral thesis (1961) was "Iran in the 3rd-4th Centuries. Formation of the Sasanian State and Artifacts of the Official Art" and he was awarded a D.Litt. in 1972 for a thesis on "Early Sasanian Iran. Some Problems of History and Culture".

Career
Lukonin worked on archaeological excavations in Central Asia each year from  1951 to 1963, and in 1957 took up a post in the Oriental department of the Hermitage Museum. He became head of that department in 1965 and remained in post until his death on 10 September 1984.

Recognitions
In 1988, Mary Anna Marten established the Ancient Persia Fund at the British Museum in his honour.

The British Museum held two seminars in his memory: Early Mesopotamia and Iran: contact and conflict, 3500-1600 BC and Later Mesopotamia and Iran: tribes and empires, 1600-539 BC .

Selected publications

References

Further reading
 

1932 births
1984 deaths
Russian archaeologists
Curators from Saint Petersburg
Saint Petersburg State University alumni